"Anything That's Part of You" is a 1961 song recorded by Elvis Presley accompanied by The Jordanaires written by Don Robertson which was a Top 40 hit in the U.S., reaching #31.

Background

It was recorded by Elvis Presley on October 15, 1961, for RCA Records at RCA Studio B in Nashville, Tennessee. It was released as the B side of the no. 1 hit "Good Luck Charm' on February 27, 1962 reaching the Top 40 in the U.S. The song was published by Gladys Music, Inc.

Other recordings
It has also been recorded by Bobby Solo (in German as, "Vielleicht kannst du mich jetzt versteh'n") and by Les Gants Noirs (in French as "Un soir sans toi) in 1966 and by Billy "Crash" Craddock in 1968 for Chart Records. Billy J. Kramer with The Dakotas recorded the song in 1964. Lawrence Welk released a version in 1962 on the Young World album. Don Robertson recorded a version in 1965. In 2015, a new version by Elvis Presley was release accompanied by The Royal Philharmonic Orchestra.

Charts
The single peaked at #6 on the Billboard Easy Listening Chart, #31 on the Billboard Top 100, and #51 on the Cash Box Top 100.

The first album appearance was on the RCA compilation Elvis' Golden Records Volume 3, released in September 1963.

References

Elvis Presley songs
Billy "Crash" Craddock songs
1961 songs
1960s songs
Songs written by Don Robertson (songwriter)